William Woolsey Johnson (1841–1927) was an American mathematician, who was one of the founders of the American Mathematical Society.

Life and work 
Johnson, son of a farmer of Tioga County, New York, studied at Yale University where he received his BA in 1862. After two years serving in the Nautical Almanac Office in Cambridge, Massachusetts, he began his academic career as assistant professor in the Naval Academy in Newport, Rhode Island, but soon transferred to Annapolis, Maryland, from 1864 to 1869. In 1870 he was appointed professor of mathematics at Kenyon College and since 1872 at St. John's College (Annapolis). In 1881 he returned to the Naval Academy as full professor where he remained until his retirement in 1921.

He served as one of the five members of the Council of the American Mathematical Society for the 1892–1893 term and he was one of the impulsors of the birth of the Bulletin of the Society and one of his main first contributors.

Johnson is mainly remembered by his books on differential calculus, basing it on related rates. He is also known to be the first on probing the conditions of solvability of the 15 puzzle.

Selected publications

Articles

Books

References

Bibliography

External links 
 
 

19th-century American mathematicians
1841 births
1927 deaths
Woolsey family